Maricá is a municipality located in the Brazilian state of Rio de Janeiro.

Geography
Maricá is a city of the Rio de Janeiro Metropolitan Area, located on the coast of the Atlantic Ocean and 25 miles away from the city of Rio de Janeiro.

The municipality contains part of the  Serra da Tiririca State Park, created in 1991.

Population

Area
Its area is 362,571 km2.

Territorial organization 

Maricá is administratively divided into 50 bairros (neighborhoods) and 4 distritos (districts).

Transportation
Maricá has an airport, the Maricá Airport. Maricá is served by the roads BR-116 and RJ-104.

Economy
Maricá has received many royalties from the Brazilian energy company Petrobras, because of the Campos Basin and Santos Basin oil field.

References

 Conhecendo a Cidade de Maricá - 

Municipalities in Rio de Janeiro (state)
Populated coastal places in Rio de Janeiro (state)